Zbaždi is a village in Municipality of Struga, North Macedonia.

Population
As of the 2021 census, Zbaždi had 10 residents with the following ethnic composition:
Macedonians 4
Persons for whom data are taken from administrative sources 6

Population (2002 Macedonian census): 10
 Macedonians 10

References

Villages in Struga Municipality
Albanian communities in North Macedonia